Lebanon participated in the 15th Asian Games, officially known as the XV Asiad held in Doha, Qatar from December 1 to December 15, 2006. Lebanon ranked 26th with a lone gold medal and 2 bronze medals in this edition of the Asiad.

Medalists

References

Nations at the 2006 Asian Games
2006
Asian Games